The New York Philharmonic concert of April 6, 1962, is widely regarded as one of the most controversial in the orchestra's history. Featuring a performance by Glenn Gould of the First Piano Concerto of Johannes Brahms, conducted by its music director, Leonard Bernstein, the concert became famous because of Bernstein's remarks from the podium prior to the concerto. Before Gould performed, Bernstein disassociated himself from the interpretation that was to come, describing it as "unorthodox" and departing from Brahms' original tempi. Gould, for his part, claimed publicly to be in favor of Bernstein's remarks; however, fallout from the event has since been cited as one of the factors that led Gould to withdraw from public performances for the remaining two decades of his career.

Background
The concert was planned as a regular subscription concert towards the end of the orchestra's 71st season – its last at Carnegie Hall – and was not expected to cause any great stir. But several days before beginning rehearsals, Gould called Bernstein regarding some discoveries he had made while studying the score. The conductor was curious, later writing: 

Nevertheless, the novelty of Gould's ideas needed to be shared carefully with the orchestra, and later with the public. The issue at hand was that Gould chose to take three very slow tempi in playing the three movements. Bernstein, in urging the musicians not to give up, referred to Gould as a "great man" and held that his ideas should be taken seriously.

The concert
The pre-intermission part of the concert program consisted of two works by Carl Nielsen, the overture to his opera Maskarade, conducted by assistant John Canarina, and his Fifth Symphony. This went smoothly, but the second half of the concert was less sure. Even Gould's performance was not guaranteed, as he regularly canceled at the last minute. Consequently, the orchestra was ready with another work of Brahms, his First Symphony, which was to be performed on the Saturday concert of the subscription series in place of the concerto. Canarina later remembered seeing Harold Gomberg, principal oboe of the orchestra, standing by backstage to see if he would be needed for the symphony. Only when the concerto, for which he was not required, actually began did he leave the hall. In the event, Gould did perform, choosing to work from the orchestral score, which had been affixed to large pieces of cardboard on the piano.

Given the unusual nature of Gould's conception of the piece, Bernstein determined that he would make a few remarks from the podium to better prepare the audience for the performance to come. He did this at the Thursday concert, widely seen as a "preview" of the rest of the run, to which critics did not come; however, he repeated his speech at the Friday concert, which was usually the one chosen for review.

Bernstein's remarks from the podium:

Controversy

Bernstein's remarks
Bernstein's remarks occasioned much comment from nearly all the critics present. Some viewed his idea favorably, others less so. Harold C. Schonberg, in particular, took great exception to Bernstein's decision, taking him severely to task in the next day's edition of The New York Times. Schonberg cast his review in the form of a letter to his friend "Ossip" (believed by some to be a version of pianist Ossip Gabrilowitsch) in which he decried numerous aspects of the performance, specifically the conductor's seeming attempt to throw blame onto the soloist:
 He finished with a swipe at Gould's technique. Reviews were also printed in most New York City newspapers, and in some others around the world.

In a later writing, Bernstein maintained that his comments were an explanation, not a disclaimer, and that he had pre-approval from Gould.So I said to Glenn backstage, "You know, I have to talk to the people. How would it be if I warned them that it was going to be very slow, and prepare them for it? Because if they don't know, they really might leave. I'll just tell them that there is a disagreement about the tempi between us, but that because of the sportsmanship element in music I would like to go along with your tempo and try it." It wasn't to be a disclaimer; I was very much interested in the results—particularly the audience reaction to it. I wrote down a couple of notes on the back of an envelope and showed them to Glenn: "Is this okay?" And he said, "Oh, it's wonderful, what a great idea."

Gould's performance
Gould's performance, too, came in for a great deal of criticism. Clocking in at just over 53 minutes long, it was seen at the time to be far too slow. Gould was also criticized for taking excessive liberties with score markings. More recent research has, to a point, validated Gould's ideas, with Gould's chosen tempo being similar to previous performances of the piece. Bernstein's later recording of the concerto, with Krystian Zimerman, runs to 54 minutes (although the first movement, at 24:32 vs. 25:37, and third movement, at 13:00 vs. 13:34, are considerably shorter), and other recordings are of comparable length. Gould, for his part, is said to have thoroughly enjoyed the proceedings, especially the fact that he had provoked some booing from the audience; he held that some controversy was better than quiet complacence with the performance. He also allowed some leeway; before the Sunday afternoon concert, at Bernstein's request, he allowed the conductor more freedom with the orchestra, and as a consequence the speech was not given.

Recording
Columbia Records had planned to release a recording of the concerto, as part of its agreement with the Philharmonic and with Bernstein. Both he and Gould were on contract to the company; it had further been expected that he would record most of the orchestra's concert repertory for distribution. Nevertheless, after the controversy over Gould's performance, it was decided (by Schuyler Chapin, then director of the company) to shelve any plans for a commercial release. The concert had, however, been broadcast live, and bootleg pressings of the broadcast circulated for some years. As a result, it was decided to release the performance on Sony Classical; the disc is rounded out with Bernstein's remarks and with a radio interview with Gould from 1963.

Other recordings exist of Gould playing the same concerto at a more conventional tempo, one with the Canadian conductor Victor Feldbrill, and another with the Baltimore Symphony under Peter Herman Adler (October 9, 1962, once available on Music & Arts CD-297).

Legacy
The performance is still regularly referred to by critics and features in retrospectives of Gould's career. Gould, speaking in 1982, was unrepentant:

Musical humorist Peter Schickele, in The Definitive Biography of P.D.Q. Bach, referred to this concert in his entry for P.D.Q. Bach's Concerto for Piano vs. Orchestra; he then claimed that at the premiere of the P.D.Q. Bach concerto, the conductor, pianist, and concertmaster all turned to the audience, and in unison disassociated themselves with the piece itself.

A 2020 Swiss radio documentary re-enacted the controversy.

References

External links
 
 

Classical music concerts
1962 in American music
Glenn Gould
1962 in New York City
April 1962 events in the United States
New York Philharmonic